Bertrum Scarborough Green (born June 9, 1974) is a former Major League Baseball outfielder.

Drafted by the St. Louis Cardinals in the 10th round of the 1992 MLB amateur draft, Green made his Major League Baseball debut with the St. Louis Cardinals on August 2, 1997, and he appeared in his final game on October 1, 2000.

Green set a Texas Rangers team record with 5 stolen bases in one game on September 28, 2000.  The record stands to this day.

Following his career in baseball, Green pursued a collegiate football career at NCAA Division II Harding University. Green transferred to Division III McMurry University in Abilene, Texas, to play football.

While serving as the football team's punter, wide receiver, and in other positions, Green participated in track and field for McMurry. Green had a strong leg in the 2007 National Champion McMurry University 4x100 relay team, and he added to his All-American titles by running in the 4x400 relay.

He is now the Wide Receivers coach at Howard Payne University in Brownwood, Texas. Green was recently hired to be the running backs coach at Brownwood High School. Green was then hired at Greenville High School in Texas to coach Football and Baseball. Although he will be coaching soccer for the 2011-2012 school year and 2012-2013 school year. Beginning in the 2014-2015 school year, Green has been employed as a speech teacher and assistant girls soccer coach ar Midland High School in Midland, TX.

References

External links

Pelota Binaria (Venezuelan Winter League)

1974 births
Living people
African-American baseball players
Altoona Curve players
Arizona League Cardinals players
Arkansas Travelers players
Baseball players from Missouri
Cardenales de Lara players
American expatriate baseball players in Venezuela
Johnson City Cardinals players
Louisville Redbirds players
Major League Baseball outfielders
Major League Baseball replacement players
Memphis Redbirds players
Nashville Sounds players
New Haven Ravens players
Oklahoma RedHawks players
People from St. Louis County, Missouri
Savannah Cardinals players
St. Louis Cardinals players
STLCC Archers baseball players
St. Petersburg Cardinals players
Texas Rangers players
Harding University alumni
21st-century African-American sportspeople
20th-century African-American sportspeople